Sir Robert Patrick Malcolm Gower  (18 August 1887 – 31 August 1964) was a British civil servant who served as the Principal Private Secretary to the Prime Minister between 1922 and 1928.

Early life 
Patrick Gower was born on 18 August 1887, the younger son of Captain Erasmus Gower of Pembrokeshire. He was educated at Marlborough College and gained a scholarship to Emmanuel College, Cambridge.

Career 
Gower served as Private Secretary to Austen Chamberlain as Chancellor of the Exchequer and as Lord Privy Seal, from 1919 to 1922. He served as Principal Private Secretary to the Prime Minister of the United Kingdom, during which time he served three different prime ministers; Bonar Law; Stanley Baldwin; and Ramsay MacDonald, from 1922 to 1928. After leaving 10 Downing Street, Gower served as Chief Press Officer to the Conservative Party from 1929 to 1939. In 1939 he left Whitehall to become chairman of advertising firm Charles F. Higham, where he remained until retirement.

He was awarded an Order of the Bath (CB) in the 1922 New Years Honours list; a Royal Victorian Order (CVO) in 1923; and was knighted (KBE) for services to the Prime Minister. in the 1924 Prime Minister's Resignation Honours.

Personal life 
He married Nancy Barkley in 1913, with whom he had one son and one daughter. Upon her death in 1940 he remarried in March 1941 to H. Margaret Hawdon. He died at home in Henley, Oxfordshire on 31 August 1964.

References 

  alongside Ronald Waterhouse

1887 births
1964 deaths
People educated at Marlborough College
Alumni of Emmanuel College, Cambridge
British civil servants
Knights Commander of the Order of the British Empire
Knights Grand Cross of the Order of the Bath
Commanders of the Royal Victorian Order
Place of birth missing